Ženski fudbalski klub Crvena zvezda is a women's football club from Belgrade, Serbia. The club is a part of the Sports Society Red Star.

Honours and achievements

Serbian SuperLiga
Runners-up (4): 2011–12, 2014–15, 2016–17, 2017–18
Third place (2): 2013–14, 2015–16

Serbian Cup
Winners (1): 2017–18
Runners-up (3): 2011–12, 2014–15, 2018–19

Friendly tournaments
Winners (1): International Tournament Strumica 2017
Runners-up (1): International Tournament Sarajevo 2018

Current squad

References

External links
 ŽFK Crvena zvezda

Crvena zvezda
Red Star Belgrade
Women's football clubs in Serbia
Football clubs in Belgrade
Association football clubs established in 2011
2011 establishments in Serbia